Clyde Davis Eddleman (January 17, 1902 – August 19, 1992) was a United States Army four-star general who served as commander, United States Army Europe from 1959 to 1960, and as Vice Chief of Staff of the United States Army from 1960 to 1962.

Military career

Eddleman was born on January 17, 1902, in Orange, Texas. He graduated from Lake Charles High School in Lake Charles, Louisiana in 1919. In 1924 he graduated from the United States Military Academy, receiving his commission in the Infantry.

Eddleman went to Australia with General Walter Krueger in early 1943 as assistant chief of staff, G-3, and remained there until 1945. He participated in all of Sixth United States Army's campaigns, including the occupation of Japan. He was awarded the Army Distinguished Service Medal for his activities in the Leyte and Luzon Campaigns, and the Silver Star for reconnaissance under fire at Biak, Leyte, and Manila. He was promoted to brigadier general at the Leyte beachhead.

Because of his familiarity with joint operations, Eddleman was selected by General Douglas MacArthur to become a member of the Joint Operations Review Board from January to June 1946. He was then selected to be the first deputy commandant of the Armed Forces Staff College. He was chairman of the faculty board and director of instruction of the school for the first four classes.

Eddleman arrived in Trieste in June 1949 to become deputy commander of Trieste United States Troops (TRUST), and director general, civil affairs, Allied Military Government. He remained in this assignment for over a year.

In November 1950 Eddleman was recalled to Washington to become chief of Plans Division, G-3, and later G-3 of the army. He remained in that position until 1954. In May of that year, he assumed command of the 4th Infantry Division, at the time headquartered in Frankfurt, Germany. In May 1955, he was reassigned as commandant of the Army War College, staying in that position only four months until he was moved to deputy chief of staff for military operations and operations deputy for Joint Chiefs of Staff activities. He then assumed command of the Seventh United States Army in Germany on July 1, 1958. Nine months later he was promoted to four-star rank and assigned as Commander-in-Chief, United States Army, Europe, and remained there until November 1, 1960, when he became Vice Chief of Staff of the United States Army. He filled this position until his retirement on March 31, 1962.

Awards
Eddleman's awards and decorations include the Army Distinguished Service Medal with oak leaf cluster, the Silver Star, the Legion of Merit, the Bronze Star Medal, and the Philippine Distinguished Service Star.

Post military
After retiring from the army, Eddleman was a vice president of Universal Match Corporation for four years, later becoming director and corporate representative. He also was on the board of directors of the Army and Air Force Mutual Aid Association from 1962 to 1980, when he was elected chairman of the board, a position he filled until 1982. Eddleman died at Walter Reed Army Medical Center on August 19, 1992, survived by his wife, Lorraine Heath Eddleman (1904–1999), and one son, John Heath Eddleman. He and Lorraine are now buried at Arlington National Cemetery.

References

 General Orders No. 22, October 5, 1992 Death of Clyde Davis Eddleman

1902 births
1992 deaths
People from Orange, Texas
United States Military Academy alumni
Recipients of the Distinguished Service Medal (US Army)
Recipients of the Silver Star
Recipients of the Legion of Merit
People from Lake Charles, Louisiana
Burials at Arlington National Cemetery
United States Army Vice Chiefs of Staff
United States Army generals of World War II
United States Army generals
Military personnel from Texas